Stera or STERA may refer to:
Steroh, a town in Yemen
Chautauqua, Cattaraugus, Allegany and Steuben Southern Tier Extension Railroad Authority, owner of a rail line in New York